TWISTEX (a backronym for Tactical Weather-Instrumented Sampling in/near Tornadoes Experiment) was a tornado research experiment that was founded and led by Tim Samaras of Bennett, Colorado, US, that ended in the deaths of three researchers in the 2013 El Reno tornado. The experiment announced in 2015 that there were some plans for future operations, but no additional information has been announced since.

Background
The project normally ran from mid-April through the end of June with a domain that covers the Great Plains and portions of the Midwestern United States. The project was normally at full strength for most of May and June with four vehicles, all equipped with roof-mounted mobile mesonet weather stations. One of the vehicles transported an array of in situ thermodynamic and video probes. Due to graduate and upper-division undergraduate student participant availability, a reduced vehicle compliment consisting of the in situ probe deployment truck and one support mesonet station vehicle was used in the first few weeks of the project.

The research objectives were to better understand tornado generation, maintenance and decay processes and to gain insight and knowledge of the seldom sampled near-surface internal tornado environment. Progress on these research fronts was aimed toward increasing tornado warning lead time, while the internal tornado near-surface sampling provided essential ground truth data for structural engineering analysis of the interaction of tornadic winds with homes and buildings.

TWISTEX was one of the featured teams in seasons 3, 4 and 5 of Storm Chasers on the Discovery Channel. The group was also featured on National Geographic Channel's "Disaster Labs".

May 31, 2013 deaths

On May 31, 2013, Tim Samaras, his 24-year-old son Paul Samaras, and 45-year-old California native Carl Young lost their lives in the record wide EF3 multiple-vortex El Reno tornado. They were unable to escape along gravel roads as the funnel rapidly expanded to envelop them. Their Chevrolet Cobalt was caught by a subvortex, and Paul and Carl were ejected from the car. Tim was buckled in the passenger's seat, and was killed as the car was thrown approximately half a mile by the storm. Hinton resident Richard Henderson, who decided to follow the twister, lost his life in that same area. He snapped a picture of the storm from his cellular phone before it struck him. Several other storm chasers, including The Weather Channel's Mike Bettes, were also caught in the same sub-vortex but escaped with only minor injuries. Bettes and the Tornado Hunt crew were lifted up by the wedge tornado in their sport utility vehicle. That storm threw them two hundred yards off U.S. Route 81. The SUV was destroyed afterward. Bettes and his crew were later found and rescued by Reed Timmer and his SRV Dominator crew who were chasing for KFOR-TV Channel 4 in Oklahoma City with their storm chasers when they came upon the wrecked Great Tornado Hunt SUV. Four other people who were not involved with storm chasing also lost their lives in this tornado.

TWISTEX personnel
 Tony Laubach; Mesonet Team Leader & Video Archival/Production, Meteorologist
 Matt Grzych; Software & Systems Development, Atmospheric Scientist
 Ed Grubb; Mobile Mesonet Navigator, Mechanical Guru
 Dr. Bruce Lee; Mobile Mesonet Director, Atmospheric Scientist
 Dr. Cathy Finley; Mobile Mesonet Co-Director, Atmospheric Scientist
 Chris Karstens; Mesonet Team Leader & Software Development, ISU Atmospheric Sciences Ph.D. Student
 Ben McMillan; Mobile Mesonet Driver, Team Medic

Students from the Atmospheric Sciences Department at Iowa State University rotate shifts into the mesonet vehicles during the project.

Former TWISTEX personnel
Killed by the record breaking EF3 tornado in El Reno, Oklahoma:
 Tim Samaras; TWISTEX Director, scientist, engineer
 Paul Samaras; videographer
 Carl Young; Probe Driver, meteorologist

Tornado core sampling

Several hardened instruments will be deployed in paths of tornadoes to collect the following datasets: atmospheric pressure, temperature, humidity, wind speed and direction, and visualization for accurate debris/hydrometeor velocities and for verification of the tornado-relative location of the in situ sampling.

The thermodynamic probes are called Hardened In-situ Tornado Pressure Recorders (HITPR). All of the hardened instrumentation can collect/store the datasets. Measurements are recorded at 10 samples/second, and stored on non-volatile flash cards.

TWISTEX will also have video probes that will provide visualization using 7 cameras each for a total of 14 cameras being deployed into the tornado core. Collectively the two camera probes will be used for photogrammetry purposes to visualize/measure tornado-driven debris and hydrometeors as well as for determining the tornado-relative location of the HITPRs.

New additional technologies will be used by deployment crew members to collect photogrammetric data from tornadoes as close as possible. One technique will be to record close tornado imagery using two digitally synchronized high-resolution high-speed cameras running at 500 frames per second for stereo photogrammetry techniques. This technique will provide excellent time resolution for velocity determination of low-level tornado core winds and lofted debris.

Tornado proximity environment sampling

While there are abundant kinematic datasets gathered by mobile radar of the tornadic region of supercells, the number of quality mobile mesonet or sticknet thermodynamic datasets of the flow field proximate to the tornadic region, generally within the supercell rear-flank downdraft (RFD) outflow, are comparatively rare. Even rarer are mesonet datasets reaching within about 1.5 km of tornadoes and datasets sampling the thermodynamic evolution of the RFD outflow.

Each of the participating TWISTEX vehicles will have a mobile mesonet (MM) station mounted on the roof including the probe deployment truck. The mobile mesonet will be attempting to gather near-surface thermodynamic and kinematic data in as many quadrants of the RFD as possible. When coupled with the in-situ probe array data which represents another effective mesonet station, it is hoped to obtain thermodynamic and kinematic mapping that will describe characteristics of the flow reaching the tornado. Even if the hardened tornado probes do not take a direct hit, a peripheral tornado sampling is still very worthwhile.

TWISTEX publications
Participants of the TWISTEX research project have contributed to many publications.

AMS Journal and Conference Papers
Karstens, C. D., W. A. Gallus, B. D. Lee, and C. A. Finley, 2013: Analysis of tornado-induced tree-fall using aerial photography from the Joplin, MO, and Tuscaloosa-Birmingham, AL, tornadoes of 2011. J. Appl. Meteorol. Climatol., Early online release: http://journals.ametsoc.org/doi/pdf/10.1175/JAMC-D-12-0206.1
Lee, B. D., C. A. Finley, and C. D. Karstens, 2012: The Bowdle, South Dakota, cyclic tornadic supercell of 22 May 2010: Surface analysis of rear-flank downdraft evolution and multiple internal surges. Mon. Wea. Rev., 140, 3419-3441. http://journals.ametsoc.org/doi/abs/10.1175/MWR-D-11-00351.1
Lee, B. D., C. A. Finley, and T. M. Samaras, 2011: Surface analysis near and within the Tipton, Kansas, tornado on 29 May 2008. Mon. Wea. Rev., 139, 370-386. http://journals.ametsoc.org/doi/abs/10.1175/2010MWR3454.1
Karstens, C. D., T. M. Samaras, B. D. Lee, W. A. Gallus, and C. A. Finley, 2010: Near-ground pressure and wind measurements in tornadoes. Mon. Wea. Rev., 138, 2570-2588. http://journals.ametsoc.org/doi/pdf/10.1175/2010MWR3201.1
Finley, C. A., B. D. Lee, M. Grzych, C. D. Karstens, and T. M. Samaras, 2010: Mobile mesonet observations of the rear-flank downdraft evolution associated with a violent tornado near Bowdle, SD on 22 May 2010. Electronic proceedings, 25th Conf. on Severe Local Storms, Denver, CO. Amer. Meteor. Soc., 8A.2. http://ams.confex.com/ams/pdfpapers/176132.pdf
Karstens, C. D., T. M. Samaras, W. A. Gallus, C. A. Finley, B. D. Lee 2010: Analysis of near-surface wind flow in close proximity to tornadoes. Electronic proceedings, 25th Conf. on Severe Local Storms, Denver, CO. Amer. Meteor. Soc., P10.11. http://ams.confex.com/ams/pdfpapers/176188.pdf
Lee, B. D., C. A. Finley, C. D. Karstens, and T. M. Samaras, 2010: Surface observations of the rear-flank downdraft evolution associated with the Aurora, NE tornado of 17 June 2009. Electronic proceedings, 25th Conf. on Severe Local Storms, Denver, CO. Amer. Meteor. Soc., P8.27. http://ams.confex.com/ams/pdfpapers/176133.pdf
Finley, C. A., and B. D. Lee, 2008: Mobile mesonet observations of an Intense RFD and multiple gust fronts in the May 23 Quinter, Kansas tornadic supercell during TWISTEX 2008. Electronic proceedings, 24th Conf. on Severe Local Storms, Savannah, GA Amer. Meteor. Soc., P3.18. http://ams.confex.com/ams/pdfpapers/142133.pdf
Karstens, C. D., T. M. Samaras, A. Laubach, B. D. Lee, C. A. Finley, W. A. Gallus, F. L. Hann, 2008. TWISTEX 2008: In situ and mobile mesonet observations of tornadoes. Electronic proceedings, 24th Conf. on Severe Local Storms, Savannah, GA Amer. Meteor. Soc., P3.11. http://ams.confex.com/ams/pdfpapers/141974.pdf
Lee, B.D., C. A. Finley, and T. M. Samaras, 2008: Thermodynamic and kinematic analysis near and within the Tipton, KS tornado on May 29 during TWISTEX 2008. Electronic proceedings, 24th Conf. on Severe Local Storms, Savannah, GA Amer. Meteor. Soc., P3.13. http://ams.confex.com/ams/pdfpapers/142078.pdf
Grzych, M. L., B. D. Lee, and C. A. Finley, 2007: Thermodynamic analysis of supercell rear-flank downdrafts from Project ANSWERS. Mon. Wea. Rev., 135, 240-246. http://ams.allenpress.com/perlserv/?request=get-pdf&doi=10.1175%2FMWR3288.1
Finley, C. A., and B. D. Lee, 2004: High resolution mobile mesonet observations of RFD surges in the June 9 Basset, Nebraska supercell during project answers 2003. Preprints, 22nd Conf. on Severe Local Storms, Hyannis, MA, CD-ROM, 11.3. http://ams.confex.com/ams/pdfpapers/82005.pdf
Lee, B. D., C. A. Finley, and P. Skinner, 2004: Thermodynamic and kinematic analysis of multiple RFD surges for the 24 June 2003 Manchester, South Dakota cyclic tornadic supercell during Project ANSWERS 2003. Preprints, 22nd Conf. on Severe Local Storms, Hyannis, MA, Amer. Meteor. Soc., CD-ROM, 11.2. http://ams.confex.com/ams/pdfpapers/82000.pdf
Lee, J. J., T. M. Samaras, and C. R. Young, 2004: Pressure measurements at the ground in an F-4 tornado. 22nd Conf. on Severe Local Storms, Hyannis, MA, Amer, Meteor. Soc., CD_ROM, 15.3. http://ams.confex.com/ams/pdfpapers/81700.pdf
Samaras, T. M., 2004: A historical perspective of in-situ observations within tornado cores. Preprints, 22nd Conf. on Severe Local Storms, Hyannis, MA, Amer, Meteor. Soc., CD_ROM, P11.4. http://ams.confex.com/ams/pdfpapers/81153.pdf
Samaras, T.M., and J. J. Lee, 2004. Pressure measurements within a large tornado. Proc. 84th American Meteorological Society Annual Meeting - Eighth Symposium on Integrated Observing and Assimilation Systems for Atmosphere, Oceans, and Land Surface, Seattle, WA., P4.9. http://ams.confex.com/ams/pdfpapers/74267.pdf
Wurman, J., and T. Samaras, 2004: Comparison of in-situ pressure and DOW Doppler winds in a tornado and RHI vertical slices through 4 tornadoes during 1996-2004. Extended Abstracts, 22nd Conf. on Severe Local Storms, Hyannis, MA, Amer. Meteor. Soc., 15.4, 1-14. http://ams.confex.com/ams/pdfpapers/82352.pdf

National Geographic (Book and articles about Samaras research)
Tornado Hunter, by Stephen Bechtel with Tim Samaras. Published by National Geographic. pp. 272. Release May 19, 2009.
National Geographic in the Field - Tim Samaras, Severe-Storms Researcher (2005) http://www.nationalgeographic.com/field/explorers/tim-samaras.html
National Geographic Feature - New View of Tornadoes: From the Inside Looking Out (2005) http://www7.nationalgeographic.com/ngm/0506/feature6/index.html
National Geographic Events – Inside the Tornado (2005) http://www.nationalgeographic.com/speakers/profile_samaras.html
National Geographic Today - Storm Chaser Deploys Probe, Makes History (2003) http://news.nationalgeographic.com/news/2003/06/0627_030627_tvtornadochaser.html

American Society of Civil Engineers
Samaras, T. M., and J. J. Lee, 2006: Measuring tornado dynamics with in-situ instrumentation. Proceedings of the 2006 Structures Congress: 2006 Structural Engineering and Public Safety. St. Louis, Missouri, pp. 1–10, (doi 10.1061/40889(201)12). http://cedb.asce.org/cgi/WWWdisplay.cgi?0609031

ABC News (Article about Samaras research)
World News - Scientists Put an Eye in the Heart of the Storm (2005) https://abcnews.go.com/WNT/Science/story?id=831857

TWISTEX on television

TWISTEX was featured in seasons 3, 4, and 5 of Discovery Channel's Storm Chasers.

References

External links
Personal website of Tony Laubach
 Twistex's Facebook page

Tornado
Meteorology research and field projects
Storm chasing